GTx1-15 is a toxin from the Chilean tarantula venom that acts as both a voltage-gated calcium channel blocker and a voltage-gated sodium channel blocker.

Sources 

GTx1-15 is derived from the Chilean tarantula species Grammostola rosea and Phrixotrichus scrofa.

Chemistry

Sequence 
GTx1-15 is composed of 34 amino acid residues; its sequence has been determined to be DCLGFMRKCIPDNDKCCRPNLVCSRTHKWCQYVF. This peptide has a molecular weight of approximately 4 kDa and is amidated at its carboxy terminus.

Structure and Family 

GTx1-15 belongs to the GTx1 family, which consists of long loop inhibitor cystine knot (ICK) motif toxins. The GTx1-15 peptide has a conserved structure of six cysteine residues with the characteristic ICK motif, which results in proteolytic, thermal, and chemical stability.

Homology 
GTx1-15 displays sequence homology with other ion channel toxins from several spider species. It is homologous in sequence with sodium channel blocker PaurTx3 by 76.5%, and it also shares similarities in sequence with HnTx-IV (60%), CcoTx2 (55.9%), TLTx1 (55.6%), ω-GrTx SIA (40%), GsAFII (38.2%) and GsMTx2 (38.2%).

Target and Mode of Action
GTx1-15 targets low-voltage activated cation channels. It specifically inhibits:
 T-type calcium channel Cav3.1
 Sodium channels Nav1. GTx1-15 has a strong inhibitory effect on tetrodotoxin-sensitive (TTX-S) sodium channels (Nav1.7 and Nav1.3), but has a minimal effect on tetrodotoxin-resistant sodium channels (Nav1.5 and Nav1.8).

The mode of action of GTx1-15 has not yet been clarified.

IC50 
The effectiveness of GTx1-15 as a blocker of human cloned Nav and Cav channels is summarized below:

References 

Ion channel toxins
Spider toxins